Brian Walker may refer to:

 Brian Walker (American football) (born 1972), former American football safety in the National Football League
 Brian Walker (ecologist), scientist working on ecological sustainability and resilience in social-ecological systems
 Brian Walker (ice hockey) (born 1952), Canadian former professional ice hockey player
 Brian Walker (politician), member of the Western Australian Legislative Council
 Brian Walker (toy inventor), toy inventor from Bend, Oregon

See also
Bryan Walker (disambiguation)